IFC is an American premium television channel owned by AMC Networks.

Original programming

Comedy

Animation

Adult animation

Unscripted

Docuseries

Reality

Variety

Co-productions

Continuations

Web series
 Cutting Ties
 Dead & Lonely
 Four Eyed Monsters
 Funnel of Darkness
 Get Hit
 Getting Away with Murder
 Good Morning Internet!
 Lunchbox
 Like So Many Things
 The Mary Van Note Show
 The Stagg Party
 Wilfred
 The Unclothed Man in the 35th Century A.D.
 Trapped in the Closet
 Pushing Twilight
 Young American Bodies

Upcoming original programming

Ordered

In development

Acquired programming

Current
 The Kids in the Hall (2010–2012; 2021–present)
 The Three Stooges (2013–present)
 Two and a Half Men (2018–present)
 Mystery Science Theater 3000 (2020–present)
 Parks and Recreation (2020–present)
 Saved by the Bell (2020–present)
 Saved by the Bell: The College Years (2020–present)
 Three's Company (2020–present)
 3rd Rock from the Sun (2021–present)
 Back (2021–present)
 Everybody Loves Raymond (2021–present)
 Good Grief (2021–present)
 Scrubs (2021–present)
 The Ropers (2021–present)
 Three's a Crowd (2021–present)
 Gilligan's Island (2022–present)
 Slo Pitch (2021–present)
 Hogan's Heroes (2022–present)

Former
 Basilisk (2006–2007)
 Samurai 7 (2006)
 Gunslinger Girl (2007)
 Hell Girl (2008)
 The IT Crowd (2008–2012)
 Witchblade (2008)
 Arrested Development (2009–2014)
 Monty Python's Flying Circus (2009)
 Dead Set (2010)
 Freaks and Geeks (2010–2012)
 Undeclared (2010–2012)
 Wilfred (2010)
 The Ben Stiller Show (2011–2012)
 The Larry Sanders Show (2011–2012)
 Malcolm in the Middle (2011–2014)
 Mr. Show with Bob and David (2011–2012)
 Action (2012–2013)
 Dilbert (2012–2013)
 Toast of London (2013–2015)
 The Monkees (2015–2016)
 Orphan Black (2015)
 That '70s Show (2015–2020)
 Baroness von Sketch Show (2017–2021)
 Blue Planet II (2018)
 Fleabag (2018–2019)
 Pee-Wee's Playhouse (2018–2020)
 Batman (2019)
 Dynasties (2019)
 Community (2020–2021)
 Seven Worlds, One Planet (2020–2021)
 Kevin Can F**k Himself (2021)
 The Jon Dore Television Show (2007–2010)

References

Starz